Polyanovo may refer to:

 In Bulgaria (written in Cyrillic as Поляново):
 Polyanovo, Burgas Province - a village in the Aytos municipality, Burgas Province
 Polyanovo, Haskovo Province - a village in the Harmanli municipality, Haskovo Province